Končarev Kraj is a village in central Croatia, in the municipality of Plitvička Jezera, Lika-Senj County. It is connected by the D1 highway. It is a birthplace of Rade Končar, Croatian Serb antifascist, communist and People's Hero of Yugoslavia.

Demographics

Notable natives and residents 
 Rade Končar (1911–1942) - antifascist, communist and People's Hero of Yugoslavia

References 

Populated places in Lika-Senj County
Serb communities in Croatia